A Help Authoring Tool or HAT is a software program used by technical writers to create online help systems.

Functions
The basic functions of a Help Authoring Tool (HAT) can be divided into the following categories:

File input
HATs obtain their source text either by importing it from a file produced by another program, or by allowing the author to create the text within the tool by using an editor. File formats that can be imported vary from HAT to HAT. Acceptable file formats can include  ASCII, HTML, OpenOffice Writer and Microsoft Word, and compiled Help formats such as Microsoft WinHelp and Microsoft Compressed HTML Help.

Help output
The output from a HAT can be either a compiled Help file in a format such as WinHelp (*.HLP) or Microsoft Compiled HTML Help (*.CHM), or noncompiled file formats such as Adobe PDF, XML, HTML or JavaHelp.

Auxiliary functions
Some HATs provide extra functions such as:

 Automatic or assisted Index generation
 Automatic Table of Contents
 Spelling checker
 Image editing
 Image hotspot editing
 Import and export of text in XML files, for exchange with computer-assisted translation programs

Common help authoring tools
Some common HATs include:

 HelpNDoc
 Adobe RoboHelp
 HelpSmith
 Doc-To-Help
 MadCap Flare
 Help & Manual
 Sandcastle
 AsciiDoc

Related software
Technical writers often use content management systems and version control systems to manage their work.

See also
 List of help authoring tools
 User assistance

Technical communication
Technical communication tools
Online help